Chickasaw County is a county located in the U.S. state of Mississippi. As of the 2020 census, the population was 17,106. Its county seats are Houston and Okolona. The county is named for the Chickasaw people, who lived in this area for hundreds of years. Most were forcibly removed to Indian Territory in the 1830s, but some remained and became citizens of the state and the United States.

History
The Mississippi state legislature created Chickasaw County in 1836, following the cession of the land by the Chickasaw Indians. It was quickly settled by Americans from the east, mainly from the Southern states. By the time of the Civil War, riverfront landings had been developed by the many large cotton plantations worked by slaves, who outnumbered the white residents of the county.

The American Civil War devastated the local economy, completely destroying the plantation-based infrastructure of Chickasaw County. The newly freed slaves had to adapt to the new labor system, in which the white landowners still retained partial control over their lives through the practice of sharecropping. The economy declined again in the late 19th century, when falling cotton prices reduced both black and white residents to poverty. Farmers eventually began diversifying their crops, and the economy slowly began to improve.

Early in the 20th century, the first agricultural high school in Mississippi opened in the unincorporated community of Buena Vista.

Geography

Major highways
  U.S. Route 45 Alternate (Mississippi)
  Mississippi Highway 8
  Mississippi Highway 15
  Mississippi Highway 32
  Mississippi Highway 41
  Mississippi Highway 47
 Natchez Trace Parkway

Adjacent counties
 Pontotoc County (north)
 Lee County (northeast)
 Monroe County (east)
 Clay County (southeast)
 Webster County (southwest)
 Calhoun County (west)

National protected areas
 Natchez Trace Parkway (part)
 Tombigbee National Forest (part)

Demographics

2020 census

As of the 2020 United States Census, there were 17,106 people, 6,476 households, and 4,278 families residing in the county.

2010 census
As of the 2010 United States Census, there were 17,392 people living in the county. 54.0% were White, 42.1% Black or African American, 0.3% Asian, 0.1% Native American, 2.5% of some other race and 1.0% of two or more races. 3.7% were Hispanic or Latino (of any race).

2000 census
As of the census of 2000, there were 19,440 people, 7,253 households, and 5,287 families living in the county.  The population density was 39 people per square mile (15/km2).  There were 7,981 housing units at an average density of 16 per square mile (6/km2).  The racial makeup of the county was 56.89% White, 41.26% Black or African American, 0.19% Native American, 0.17% Asian, 0.04% Pacific Islander, 0.99% from other races, and 0.46% from two or more races.  2.29% of the population were Hispanic or Latino of any race.

According to the census of 2000, the largest ancestry groups in Chickasaw County were English 44.1%, African 41% and Scots-Irish 13.5%.

There were 7,253 households, out of which 36.30% had children under the age of 18 living with them, 50.80% were married couples living together, 18.00% had a female householder with no husband present, and 27.10% were non-families. 24.90% of all households were made up of individuals, and 11.90% had someone living alone who was 65 years of age or older.  The average household size was 2.65 and the average family size was 3.17.

In the county, the population was spread out, with 28.60% under the age of 18, 9.30% from 18 to 24, 27.60% from 25 to 44, 21.00% from 45 to 64, and 13.50% who were 65 years of age or older.  The median age was 34 years. For every 100 females there were 92.60 males.  For every 100 females age 18 and over, there were 87.40 males.

The median income for a household in the county was $26,364, and the median income for a family was $33,819. Males had a median income of $25,459 versus $20,099 for females. The per capita income for the county was $13,279.  About 16.80% of families and 20.00% of the population were below the poverty line, including 23.90% of those under age 18 and 22.40% of those age 65 or over.

Communities

Cities
 Houston (county seat)
 Okolona (county seat)

Towns
 New Houlka

Villages
 Woodland

Census-designated place
 Van Vleet

Unincorporated communities

 Atlanta
 Buena Vista
 Egypt
 McCondy
 Pyland
 Shake Rag
 Sparta
 Thorn
 Trebloc

Notable locals
 Singer-songwriter Bobbie Gentry, a Mississippi Musicians Hall of Fame inductee
 Bukka White, early blues performer
 William Raspberry, journalist
 Milan Williams, founding member of The Commodores
 Jim Hood, politician and former Mississippi Attorney General
 Jeff Busby, United States Representative who spearheaded the Natchez Trace Parkway
 Shaquille Vance, 2012 U.S. Paralympic National Championship, gold medal (100m), silver medal (200m)

Fictional locals
 Ida Mae Brandon Gladney, central character in the Pulitzer Prize winning book, The Warmth of Other Suns by Isabel Wilkerson
Titus Andromedon, aka Ronald Ephen Wilkerson, one of the main characters from the comedy series Unbreakable Kimmy Schmidt, was originally from Chickasaw County

In popular culture
Candieland, the plantation of the fictional Calvin Candie, played by Leonardo DiCaprio in Quentin Tarantino's film Django Unchained, is located in Chickasaw County.

Politics
Chickasaw County is a swing county. No presidential candidate has won more than 55% of the county's vote since George H. W. Bush in 1988, and it has voted Republican and Democratic an equal number of times since 1976.

See also
 National Register of Historic Places listings in Chickasaw County, Mississippi

References

 
Mississippi counties
Mississippi placenames of Native American origin
Counties of Appalachia
1836 establishments in Mississippi
Populated places established in 1836